Godfrey Louis Lyons (23 May 1853 – 30 March 1931) was an English cricketer. Lyons was a right-handed batsman. He was born at Fleetwood, Lancashire.

Lyons made a single first-class appearance for Surrey against Nottinghamshire in 1880 at The Oval. Nottinghamshire won the toss and elected to bat, making 266 all out. Surrey responded in their first-innings by being dismissed for just 16, at the time the joint fourth lowest total by a team in first-class cricket. Lyons was dismissed in the innings for a duck by Fred Morley. Forced to follow-on in their second-innings, Surrey were dismissed for 185, with Lyons scoring 8 runs before he was dismissed by Billy Barnes. Nottinghamshire won by an innings and 65 runs. This was his only major appearance for Surrey.

He died at Brighton, Sussex, on 30 March 1931.

References

External links
Godfrey Lyons at ESPNcricinfo
Godfrey Lyons at CricketArchive

1853 births
1931 deaths
People from Fleetwood
English cricketers
Surrey cricketers